St Mary Arches Church is a small church in Exeter, Devon, England, which retains many Norman features. It was a place of worship for the Mayor of Exeter and local merchants during the 14th, 15th and 16th centuries. The Arches part of the name may come from a medieval arched thoroughfare which was located next to the church.

The church is largely made of red sandstone and is listed as Grade I by Historic England.

Monuments
Within the church are monuments to the following persons:

Christopher Lethbridge (d.1670), Mayor of Exeter in 1660.

References

Further reading
Orme, Nicholas (2014) The Churches of Medieval Exeter, Impress Books, ISBN 9781907605512; pp. 132–33.

External links
 Official website

Exeter
Exeter
Churches in Exeter